Kalobje is a village in the Municipality of Šentjur, in eastern Slovenia. The settlement, and the entire municipality, are included in the Savinja Statistical Region, which is in the Slovenian portion of the historical Duchy of Styria.

The parish church in the settlement is dedicated to the Holy Name of Mary and belongs to the Roman Catholic Diocese of Celje. It was originally a 16th-century building that was restyled in the 17th and 18th centuries.

Kalobje is known for the Kalobje manuscript, an important collection of Slovenian Baroque poetry.

References

External links
Kalobje at Geopedia

Populated places in the Municipality of Šentjur